The Journal of Human Capital is a quarterly peer reviewed academic journal published by the University of Chicago Press. It covers theoretical and empirical research on the role of human capital in economics. The editor-in-chief is Isaac Ehrlich (State University of New York at Buffalo). The journal is abstracted and indexed in the Social Sciences Citation Index and Current Contents/Social & Behavioral Sciences.

References

External links 
 

Economics journals
University of Chicago Press academic journals
Quarterly journals
Publications established in 2007
English-language journals